Victoria Square may refer to:

Squares and plazas
 Victoria Memorial Square, Toronto, Canada
 Victoria Square, Adelaide, South Australia
 Viktoria Square, Athens, Greece
 Victoria Square, Belfast, Northern Ireland
 Victoria Square Shopping Centre
 Victoria Square, Birmingham, England
 Victoria Square, Christchurch, New Zealand
 Queen Victoria Square, Kingston upon Hull, England
 Victoria Square, London, England
 Victoria Square, Montreal, Quebec, Canada
 Victoria Square, Perth, Western Australia
 Victoria Square, Woking, England

Populated places
 Victoria Square, Manchester, England
 Victoria Square, Ontario, Canada

Fiction
Victoria Square, Walford, in the British TV series EastEnders

See also
List of places named after Queen Victoria
Victory Square (disambiguation)